Nygardsvatnet is a lake in the municipality of Hol in Viken county, Norway.
The lake is situated south of the Hallingskarvet mountain range. The lake serves as a reservoir for  Usta kraftverk, a hydroelectric plant which was put into operation in 1965. 
The water level is controlled by a dam at the outlet and a tunnel down to lakes Sløddfjorden and Ustevatn. 
The Usta kraftverk power plant is owned and operated by E- CO Energi.

See also
List of lakes in Norway

References

External links
E-Co website

Lakes of Viken (county)